The Basketligaen is the highest professional basketball league in Denmark. The original men's first division was founded in 1957 and the current league was founded in 1998. All-time record holder in league titles is Bakken Bears, which has captured 18 titles in its history. BMS is the only team with 5 titles in a row, starting in 1986 through 1990. The main TV partner of the league is Sport Live. The league consists of 10 teams, with no relegation rules.

Teams

Title holders 

   
 1957–58: Aarhus
 1958–59: Gladsaxe
 1959–60: Gladsaxe
 1960–61: SISU
 1961–62: SISU
 1962–63: Gladsaxe
 1963–64: Gladsaxe
 1964–65: Gladsaxe
 1965–66: SISU
 1966–67: SISU
 1967–68: Gladsaxe
 1968–69: Gladsaxe
 1969–70: Virum
 1970–71: Virum
 1971–72: SISU
 1972–73: SISU
 1973–74: Falcon
 1974–75: Falcon
 1976–77: SISU
 1973–74: Falcon
 1977–78: Falcon
 1978–79: Stevnsgade
 
 1979–80: Stevnsgade
 1980–81: SISU
 1981–82: BMS
 1982–83: SISU
 1983–84: SISU
 1984–85: SISU
 1985–86: BMS
 1986–87: BMS
 1987–88: BMS
 1988–89: BMS
 1989–90: BMS
 1990–91: Hørsholm
 1991–92: Horsens
 1992–93: Hørsholm
 1993–94: Horsens
 1994–95: Stevnsgade
 1995–96: Værløse
 1996–97: Skovbakken
 1997–98: Horsens
 1998–99: Skovbakken
 1999–00: Skovbakken
 2000–01: Skovbakken
 
 2001–02: Værløse Farum
 2002–03: Copenhagen
 2003–04: Århus
 2004–05: Skovbakken
 2005–06: Horsens
 2006–07: Skovbakken
 2007–08: Bakken Bears
 2008–09: Bakken Bears
 2009–10: Svendborg Rabbits
 2010–11: Bakken Bears
 2011–12: Bakken Bears
 2012–13: Bakken Bears
 2013–14: Bakken Bears
 2014–15: Horsens
 2015–16: Horsens
 2016–17: Bakken Bears
 2017–18: Bakken Bears
 2018–19: Bakken Bears
 2019–20: Bakken Bears
 2020–21: Bakken Bears
 2021–22: Bakken Bears

The finals

Awards

All-time Basketligaen table 
The All-time Basketligaen table is an overall record of all match results of every team that has played in Basketligaen since 1958. 

Last updated June 2018.

Statistical leaders

Source:  Eurobasket.com, Basketligaen.dk

All-time leaders 
Last updated June 1, 2018.

For a complete list, see List of Basketligaen career stat leaders.

Stats since 2002.

Single game records 
Last updated June 1, 2018.

Stats since 2002.

References

External links
Official Site 
Eurobasket.com League Page

 
Basketball in Denmark
Basketball leagues in Europe
1995 establishments in Denmark
Sports leagues established in 1995
Professional sports leagues in Denmark